Miodrag Latinović (born August 29, 1970) is a Bosnian-Herzegovinian football defender currently playing with VfL Trier/Mariahof.

Club career
Born in Bosanska Gradiška, SR Bosnia and Herzegovina, after beginning his career with FK Borac Banja Luka, in the early 1990s he moved to Serbia where he played initially with FK Mačva Šabac, and afterwards, in the First League of FR Yugoslavia, with FK Loznica and FK Spartak Subotica. In the late 1990s, he moved to Germany where he played with FC Gütersloh, SV Eintracht Trier 05 and SC Paderborn 07, mostly in the 2. Fussball Bundesliga.

External sources
 
 Career until 1999 at Tripod

1970 births
Living people
People from Gradiška, Bosnia and Herzegovina
Association football central defenders
Bosnia and Herzegovina footballers
FK Borac Banja Luka players
FK Mačva Šabac players
FK Loznica players
FK Spartak Subotica players
FC Gütersloh 2000 players
SV Eintracht Trier 05 players
SC Paderborn 07 players
First League of Serbia and Montenegro players
2. Bundesliga players
Regionalliga players
Bosnia and Herzegovina expatriate footballers
Expatriate footballers in Serbia and Montenegro
Bosnia and Herzegovina expatriate sportspeople in Serbia and Montenegro
Expatriate footballers in Germany
Bosnia and Herzegovina expatriate sportspeople in Germany